Jack Holt, OBE (8 April 1912 – 14 November 1995) was a prolific designer of sailing dinghies. His  pioneering designs of dinghies using plywood did much to popularise the sport of sailing in the period immediately following World War II.

Born in Hammersmith, London near the River Thames Holt designed more than 40 boats, many of which are listed below. He worked for many years with fellow sailing enthusiast and businessman Beecher Moore.

Jack Holt was awarded an OBE in 1979 for his services to sailing.

Sailing Clubs

Jack Holt has been associated with several sailing clubs.  His premises were next door to Ranelagh Sailing Club, and he designed the Merlin Rocket and his National 12 designs there.

In 1956 he was a co-founder of Wraysbury Lake Sailing Club.

He was closely associated with the London Corinthian Sailing Club, very close to his Putney premises.

Jack Holt Designs

Bumblebee
Caboodle was a simple kit built singlehander
Cadet
Diamond Keelboat
Enterprise
Explorer (dinghy)
GP14
Heron
Hornet
Ideal
International 10sq m Canoe
International 14
Jacksnipe
Jacksprat tender
Lazy E, later renamed to National E
Merlin Rocket
Miracle
Mirror
Mirror 16
National 12
North Norfolk 16
Pacer, formerly Puffin Pacer
Pandamaran 
Rambler
Solo
Streaker
Vagabond

A selection of Jack Holt plans are held in the archives of the National Maritime Museum Cornwall.

Boatbuilding

In addition to designing boats, Jack was also a boatbuilder.  His fittings business was in the loft above the boatbuilding workshop.  Naturally he built all the boats he designed, but he also built boats designed by others, including the Albacore.

Sailing fittings

Jack collaborated with Glen and Tony Allen from Essex to manufacture and supply a lightweight range of dinghy fittings, the fittings were known as Holt Allen fittings for 52 years until 2008 when the Allen side decided to distribute the fittings themselves under the brand Allen. The companies now trade separately as Holt Marine Ltd. and Allen Brothers (Fittings) Ltd. Holt Allen also made masts and spars for dinghies and a wide variety of other boat related fittings. Most of the fittings for the Mirror, Miracle, Mirror 14, Mirror 16 and Streaker were all provided by Holt Allen

Sailmaker
Sails for early Puffins, those with a puffin silhouette on the main, were deep blue in colour and were made by Jack Holt Sails of Putney, England. Holt sails made sails for a large number of dinghy classes for many years from the 1970s to around the early 2000s

Notes

External links
Allen Brothers (Fittings) Ltd website

References

H
English designers
Officers of the Order of the British Empire
1912 births
1995 deaths